Newspaper Boy is a 1997 Malayalam-language Indian feature film directed by Nissar, starring Mukesh, Jagathy Sreekumar and Suma (her Malayalam debut) in lead roles.

Cast

Mukesh as Krishnankutty
Suma as Sita
Jagathy Sreekumar as K.K. Ponnappan
Kalabhavan Mani as Pyasi
Kalpana
Nadirsha as Rasheed
Rajan P. Dev as Dada
Cochin Haneefa as Jagadeeshwara Iyer
Zainuddin as Phalgunan
Salim Kumar as Venkiti
K.T.S. Padannayil as Chellappan
Machan Varghese as Pakki
Meghanathan as Viswanathan
Jose Pellisseri
Kanakalatha

References

External links
 

1997 films
1990s Malayalam-language films
Films directed by Nissar